Gary Crawford (born July 15, 1960) is a Canadian politician, who was elected to Toronto City Council in the 2010 city council election to succeed Brian Ashton in Ward 36.  He held onto the seat in the 2014 municipal elections. Councillor Crawford currently sits as the Budget Chief (2014-2018). Gary served on numerous committees including Budget, Planning and Growth, Economic Development and the Executive Committee. He also served on City Boards and Agencies including East Metro Youth Centre, Sony Centre for the Performing Arts (as Interim Chair), Harbourfront Centre, St. Lawrence Centre for the Performing Arts, the Toronto Centre for the Arts and the Toronto Arts Council. He has chaired the Mayor’s Task Force on the Arts, the Theatres Working Group and Co-chaired the Film Board.

Previous to his role on Council, Crawford served a seven-year term as a TDSB Trustee. His experience included appointment as Co-chair of the Board, Chair of Facilities Management and Chair of Negotiations. Gary is a passionate advocate for arts and culture and was instrumental in historic funding increases for the arts. Before becoming a Councillor he was a professional artist and a part-time musician.

Crawford previously ran in the 2007 Ontario Provincial Election for the Progressive Conservative Party of Ontario and lost.

Election results

References

External links

1960 births
Living people
Progressive Conservative Party of Ontario candidates in Ontario provincial elections
Canadian painters
Toronto District School Board trustees
Toronto city councillors
York University alumni